The 2017 Tour de Suisse was a road cycling stage race that took place between 10 and 18 June. It was the 81st edition of the Tour de Suisse and the twenty-fourth event of the 2017 UCI World Tour.

For the second time in three years, Slovenian rider Simon Špilak won the race after taking the race lead on the seventh stage, soloing to the stage victory when the race visited Austria. He finished 48 seconds clear of  rider Damiano Caruso, while the podium was completed by 's Steven Kruijswijk, a further 20 seconds in arrears of Caruso.

In the race's other classifications,  rider Peter Sagan won the points classification for the sixth time in seven years after further extending his record for stage victories in the race – he won two stages to move to fifteen in his career;  rider Lasse Norman Hansen led the mountains classification for the duration, while the best placed home rider was Mathias Frank, finishing in seventh place overall.

Teams
As the Tour de Suisse was a UCI World Tour event, all eighteen UCI WorldTeams were invited automatically and obliged to enter a team in the race. Four UCI Professional Continental teams competed, completing the 22-team peloton.

Route
The race route was partially announced on 21 December 2016, before the full itinerary was confirmed on 2 March 2017.

Stages

Stage 1
10 June 2017 — Cham, Individual time trial (ITT)

Stage 2
11 June 2017 – Cham to Cham,

Stage 3
12 June 2017 — Menziken to Bern,

Stage 4
13 June 2017 – Bern to Villars-sur-Ollon,

Stage 5
14 June 2017 — Bex to Cevio,

Stage 6
15 June 2017 — Locarno to La Punt,

Stage 7
16 June 2017 — Zernez to Sölden (Austria),

Stage 8
17 June 2017 — Schaffhausen to Schaffhausen,

Stage 9
18 June 2017 – Schaffhausen to Schaffhausen, individual time trial (ITT)

Classification leadership table
In the 2017 Tour de Suisse, four different jerseys were awarded. The general classification was calculated by adding each cyclist's finishing times on each stage, and allowing time bonuses for the first three finishers at intermediate sprints (three seconds to first, two seconds to second and one second to third) and at the finish of mass-start stages; these were awarded to the first three finishers on all stages except for the individual time trial: the stage winner won a ten-second bonus, with six and four seconds for the second and third riders respectively. The leader of the classification received a yellow jersey; it was considered the most important of the 2017 Tour de Suisse, and the winner of the classification was considered the winner of the race.

Additionally, there was a points classification, which awarded a black jersey. In the points classification, cyclists received points for finishing in the top 5 in a stage. For winning a stage, a rider earned 10 points, with 8 for second, 6 for third, 4 for fourth and 2 for 5th place. Points towards the classification could also be accrued – awarded on a 6–3–1 scale – at intermediate sprint points during each stage; these intermediate sprints also offered bonus seconds towards the general classification as noted above.

There was also a mountains classification, the leadership of which was marked by a blue jersey. In the mountains classification, points towards the classification were won by reaching the top of a climb before other cyclists. Each climb was categorised as either hors, first, second, or third-category, with more points available for the higher-categorised climbs.

The fourth and final jersey represented the classification for Swiss riders, marked by a red jersey. This was decided the same way as the general classification, but only riders born in Switzerland were eligible to be ranked in the classification. There was also a classification for teams, in which the times of the best three cyclists per team on each stage were added together; the leading team at the end of the race was the team with the lowest total time. In addition, there was a combativity award given after each stage to the rider considered, by a jury, to have been most active, or in the case of the individual time trials, the stage winner was automatically deemed the most active rider.

References

Sources

External links

2017
2017 UCI World Tour
2017 in Swiss sport
June 2017 sports events in Europe